Saint-Vianney is a municipality in the Canadian province of Quebec, located in La Matapédia Regional Council Municipality. It was known as Saint-Jean-Baptiste-Vianney until 1988.

Demographics

Canada Census data before 2001:
 Population in 1996: 592 (-2.6% from 1991)
 Population in 1991: 608

Municipal council
 Mayor: Georges Guénard
 Councillors: Yannick Côté, Cathy Santerre, Monique Blanchette, Robert Charets, Guy Plourde, Jean-Jacques Wagner

See also
 List of municipalities in Quebec

References

Municipalities in Quebec
Incorporated places in Bas-Saint-Laurent
La Matapédia Regional County Municipality
Canada geography articles needing translation from French Wikipedia